Betta bellica. the slim betta or slender betta,  is a species of betta native to eastern Sumatra in Indonesia and Peninsular Malaysia. It is an inhabitant of swamp forests and peat swamps. It can also be found in the aquarium trade.

References

bellica
Taxa named by Henri Émile Sauvage
Fish described in 1884